Carlos Encinas Bardem (born 7 March 1963) is a Spanish actor and writer. He is often cast in tough guy roles, if not outright villains.

Biography 
Born in Madrid on 7 March 1963, he is the son of actress Pilar Bardem and brother of actors Mónica and Javier Bardem. He earned a licentiate degree in history and a diploma in foreign relations. He made his feature film debut in Not Love, Just Frenzy (1996).

Filmography

Film roles

Television roles

Books 
 Alacrán enamorado
 Mongo blanco

Accolades

References

External links 

1963 births
Living people
20th-century Spanish male actors
21st-century Spanish male actors
Carlos
Male actors from Madrid
Spanish male film actors
Spanish male television actors
21st-century Spanish screenwriters